Divine Word or Divine Logos may refer to:

Philosophy and religion
 Logos, translated loosely as the "Divine Word", originally credited to Heraclitus, circa about 535 – 475 BC
 Logos (Christianity), according to the Gospel of John, Jesus Christ is the "Divine Logos" or "Divine Word"
 Rhema, also translated loosely as the "Divine Word"
 Rhema (doctrine), understood as the "Divine Word" revealed or inspired to an individual
 Dabar, meaning "word", "talk" or "thing" in Hebrew
 Divine language, the concept of a mystical or divine proto-language, which predates and supersedes human speech
 A divinely revealed or inspired religious text, such as:
 The Bible, which in a Christian context is referred to "Divine Word" or "Word of God"
 The Quran, which in a Islamic context is referred to "Divine Word" or "Word of God"

Organizations
 The Society of the Divine Word, a Roman Catholic missionary order founded in 1875 in Germany 
 Divine Word College, a Roman Catholic seminary in Epworth, Iowa that trains students for missionary work 
 Sing Yin Secondary School, also known as  Divine Word Secondary School, a Catholic boys' school located in Lam Tin, Hong Kong

See also
 Word of God (disambiguation)